"The Same Love" is a single by The Jets, released on October 3, 1989.

History

The ballad, written by Diane Warren, was released as the second single from their album, Believe on the MCA label. The song peaked at number 87 on the Billboard Hot 100 and failed to chart on the R&B chart. However, "The Same Love" reached number 15 on the adult contemporary chart.

Charts

Cover versions
The freestyle girl group Exposé covered this song for their 1992 self-titled album.

References

External links

1989 singles
The Jets (band) songs
Songs written by Diane Warren
1989 songs
MCA Records singles